Liuzhou (IPA Pronunciation:) is a prefecture-level city in north-central Guangxi Zhuang Autonomous Region, People's Republic of China. The prefecture's population was 3,758,700 in 2010, including 1,436,599 in the built-up area made of four urban districts.

Geography 

Swimming in the river is a tradition of the city. The river is normally green, but sometimes in summer, floods from the mountain areas upstream bring sediment which colors the water yellow. In early 2012, a cadmium spill upstream caused serious pollution worries.

The river can be deep.  Normally, the depth is  but can as deep as  before it floods over the wall.  In 2000 a bus, with 78 passengers, fell over the side of a bridge, and into  of water.

Climate
Liuzhou has a  humid subtropical climate (Köppen Cfa), with mild winters and long hot summers, and very humid conditions year-round. Rain is both the heaviest and most frequent from May to August, when nearly two-thirds of the annual rainfall occurs.

History

The Liujiang men are among the earliest modern humans found in East Asia. Their remains were discovered in the Tongtianyang Cave in Liujiang County, Guangxi. Liujiang man is a Late Pleistocene Homo sapiens sapiens.

Liuzhou has a history of more than 2,100 years. The city was founded in 111 B.C. when it was known as Tanzhong.

In 742 A.D. it became known as Longcheng, after the Long River, before finally changing to Liuzhou after the Liu River in 1736.

The most famous historic figure is Liu Zongyuan (773–819), who was a poet and politician in the Tang Dynasty and who died in Liuzhou. He is commemorated by a park in the city.

Liuzhou was the site of Liuchow Airfield, used by Nationalist Chinese and American Army Air Forces in World War II. (At that time the airfield was closer to the centre, where the zoo is now.) It was captured by the Japanese army on 7 November 1944 during the Battle of Guilin–Liuzhou and recaptured by Nationalist Chinese forces on 30 June 1945 prior to the Second Guangxi Campaign.

Administrative divisions

Liuzhou has direct administration over 10 county-level divisions: 5 districts, 3 counties and 2 autonomous counties:
District: 
Chengzhong District
Liunan District
Liubei District
Yufeng District
Liujiang District
 County: 
Liucheng County
Luzhai County
Rong'an County
 Autonomous county: 
Rongshui Miao Autonomous County
Sanjiang Dong Autonomous County

Economy

Liuzhou is the second largest city in Guangxi and is the region's industrial center. According to statistics issued by the Liuzhou government in 2015, the city's GDP was 231.1 billion yuan.

Among important companies based in Liuzhou are:

LiuGong - a multinational construction machinery manufacturer
SAIC-GM-Wuling Automobile - a joint venture between General Motors, SAIC Motor and Liuzhou Wuling Motors

Tourism
As with much of Guangxi, the landscape around Liuzhou is a mix of rolling hills, mountain peaks, caves and karst scenery. It is an ideal base for exploring the minority villages in the area.

The territory is inhabited by Miao, Yao, Dong, Zhuang, Han nationality.
Dayaoshan  scenic area is in Jinxiu Yao Autonomous County,  from the city of Liuzhou.
Sanjiang  lies to the north of Liuzhou near the Hunan border. It is a Dong minority area and is surrounded by picturesque ethnic minority villages.
LiuZhou Industrial Museum was set up on the original site of the former Cotton Textile Factory No.3, and opened in 2012.
Well acclaimed Liuzhou Forest City will be built to the north of Liuzhou, in the mountains of Guangxi.

Transport

Liuzhou Bailian Airport provides flights to major cities in China.
Liuzhou has extensive rail connections with the rest of China. Hunan-Guangxi Railway (Hengyang - Pingxiang, a.k.a. Xiang-Gui Line), Jiaozuo-Liuzhou Railway (Jiaozuo - Zhicheng - Liuzhou, a.k.a. Jiao-Liu Line) Railway and Guizhou-Guangxi Railway (Guiyang - Liuzhou, a.k.a. Qian-Gui Line) make Liuzhou the center of freight transportation in Guangxi.
China National Highway 209
Liuzhou Metro is under construction.
Liuzhou-Wuzhou Railway is a newly released railway line, linking the cities of Liuzhou with Wuzhou.

Military 
Liuzhou is the headquarters of the 41st Group Army of the People's Liberation Army, one of the two army groups that comprise the Guangzhou Military Region responsible for the defense of China's southern coast and its border with Vietnam.

Quotes
Liuzhou appears in the Chinese saying .
Born in Suzhou, live in Hangzhou, eat in Guangzhou, die in Liuzhou
because, in the past, the city was known for its coffins, made from firwood, camphor wood, and sandalwood, which are said to preserve the body after death. Guangzhou's "Cantonese" cuisine is famous worldwide, and Hangzhou is known for its prosperity and the beauty of its location. Suzhou is reputed to have the most beautiful people in China, so the line is sometimes given as "Marry in Suzhou...".

The coffins are usually inscribed  which means 'get promotion and get rich". The second and fourth characters are homophones of  meaning 'coffin'.

Some miniature coffins are used as caskets to hold the ashes of ancestors.

Notable people
Liuzhou was the home of Li Ning (born 1963), gymnast and entrepreneur who lit the Olympic torch in Beijing in 2008.
Chinese gymnast, Jiang Yuyuan.

See also
List of twin towns and sister cities in China

References

External links

  (in Chinese and English)
 Introduction to Liuzhou
 Map of Liuzhou

 
Cities in Guangxi
Prefecture-level divisions of Guangxi